Strafford station is a commuter rail station located in the western suburbs of Philadelphia at Old Eagle School Road and Crestline Road, in Tredyffrin Township, and it is served by most Paoli/Thorndale Line trains.

The ticket office at this station is open weekdays from 5:50 a.m. to 1:15 p.m., excluding holidays. There are 289 parking spaces at the station, including SEPTA permit parking in nearby lots.

This station is 15.4 track miles from Philadelphia's Suburban Station. In 2017, the average total weekday boardings at this station was 780, and the average total weekday alightings was 621.

History
From 1873 to 1883, the building served as the railway station for Wayne, Pennsylvania. In 1883, the building was moved to its current location in Strafford, which was then called Eagle. The name was changed to Strafford in 1887. The landmark building was constructed in the "Eastlake" or "Stick" architectural style popular from 1855 to 1877. In 1911 the Philadelphia and Western Railroad extended their Strafford Branch to the station; this line lasted until 1956. The train station was added to the National Register of Historic Places in 1984. Rumors that the station had originally been one of the buildings used in the 1876 Centennial Exposition in Philadelphia are unfounded.

The Southeastern Pennsylvania Transportation Authority (SEPTA) restored the station between 1999 and 2002 after damage from a June, 1999 fire. Work included restoring the historic station building as well as the outbound shelter. The station was made ADA-compliant with ramps to the platforms. Mini-high-level platforms will be installed after the Amtrak Keystone Corridor project is complete.

Station layout
Strafford has two low-level side platforms with pathways connecting the platforms to the inner tracks.

References

External links

Library of Congress: Images and data
SEPTA - Strafford Station
 Station House from Google Maps Street View

SEPTA Regional Rail stations
Former Pennsylvania Railroad stations
Philadelphia to Harrisburg Main Line
Railway stations on the National Register of Historic Places in Pennsylvania
Railway stations in Chester County, Pennsylvania
Railway stations in the United States opened in 1873
Relocated buildings and structures in Pennsylvania
National Register of Historic Places in Chester County, Pennsylvania